Edwards (formerly, Muroc and Wherry Housing) is an unincorporated community in Kern County, California.

The area was originally a housing site for the air force base that surrounds it. The place name changed to Edwards in 1951 (after the base was renamed and a post office transferred from Muroc was established). It is part of the Edwards Air Force Base reservation.

Climate
According to the Köppen Climate Classification system, Edwards has a semi-arid climate, abbreviated "BSk" on climate maps.

References

Populated places in the Mojave Desert
Unincorporated communities in Kern County, California
Edwards Air Force Base
Unincorporated communities in California